USS Eisner (DE-192) was a  built for the United States Navy during World War II. She served in the Atlantic Ocean and the Pacific Ocean and provided escort service against submarine and air attack for Navy vessels and convoys. Following the war, the ship was transferred to the Royal Netherlands Navy under the Mutual Defense Assistance Program in 1951 and served as HNLMS De Zeeuw. The Netherlands returned the ship to the United States in 1967 and Eisner was sold for scrap in February 1968.

Service history
The ship was launched on 12 December 1943 by Federal Shipbuilding and Dry Dock Co. at their yard in Kearny, New Jersey, sponsored by Mrs. Lester Eisner, Jr. the sister-in-law of Lieutenant (junior grade) Eisner. The destroyer escort was commissioned on 1 January 1944.
 
On 15 February 1944 Eisner became the flagship for Commander, Escort Division 55. After escorting a convoy to Galveston, Texas, and back to Norfolk, Virginia, Eisner was assigned to Task Force TF 63 for transatlantic escort duty. She made one voyage to Recife, Brazil, two voyages to the Mediterranean Sea, then five to British and French ports, guarding the supply line to the advancing Allied troops in Europe.
 
Eisner sailed from New York on 9 June 1945 for Eniwetok the day after European hostilities ended. She escorted convoys between Eniwetok and Ulithi, then screened the attack transport  to Wake Island with forces to repossess the island. She continued patrol and escort duty out of Eniwetok until 15 December 1945, then sailed home.

She was placed out of commission in reserve at Mayport, Florida, on 5 July 1946. On 1 March 1951 she was transferred to the Netherlands under the Mutual Defense Assistance Program, and served as HNLMS De Zeeuw (F810). She was returned to the United States Navy on 15 December 1967, and then sold for scrapping in February 1968.

References

Bibliography

External links
 
 

Cannon-class destroyer escorts of the United States Navy
Ships built in Kearny, New Jersey
1943 ships
World War II frigates and destroyer escorts of the United States
Ships transferred from the United States Navy to the Royal Netherlands Navy